Avangard is a rural locality (a village) in Tavtimanovsky Rural Settlement of Iglinsky District, Bashkortostan, Russia. The population was 67 . There is 1 street.

Geography 
Avangard is located 25 km northeast of Iglino (the district's administrative centre) by road. Klyuchevskoye is the nearest rural locality.

References 

Rural localities in Iglinsky District